Venceremos is a Cuban newspaper, founded in 1962. It is published in Spanish, with an online English edition.
The newspaper is located in Guantánamo.

External links 
 Venceremos online 

Newspapers published in Cuba
Publications established in 1962
Mass media in Guantánamo